Operation Grouse may refer to:

 Operation Grouse (Normandy), a British advance towards Tinchebray, France, in 1944
 Operation Grouse (Norway), a sabotage raid against the Vermork heavy water plant, Norway, in 1942
 Operation Grouse (Czechoslovakia), German Nazi operation against Czech partisans in Beskid Mountains, in 1944